Ellyse is a given name. Notable people with the name include:

 Ellyse Gamble (born 1997), Australian rules footballer
 Ellyse Perry (born 1990), Australian cricketer

See also
 Ellys

English-language feminine given names